Gryllotalpa africana, also known as the African mole cricket, is a relatively small mole cricket species, native to Africa, but local populations exist in Asia, and southern Europe.

Subspecies and similar species
It is now understood that G. africana is a species complex that may include cryptic species. These cryptic species can be distinguished only by their song patterns. There are two subspecies of G. africana; the Orthoptera Species File lists:
 Gryllotalpa africana Palisot de Beauvois, 1805
 G. africana africana Palisot de Beauvois, 1805 (Africa, Portugal, Indian Subcontinent)
 G. africana microphtalma Chopard, 1936 (Senegal)
 Gryllotalpa bulla Townsend, 1983
 Gryllotalpa debilis Gerstaecker, 1869
 Gryllotalpa devia Saussure, 1877
 Gryllotalpa robusta Townsend, 1983
 Gryllotalpa rufescens Chopard, 1948

Biology
The species is omnivorous. The mole cricket lives underground, making burrows and feeding on plant roots, larvae and other insects. It goes to the surface only at night - mostly in the mating season. It can fly too, when changing territory or when females are searching for males. Males call females by chirping. This cricket is considered a pest in some regions.

References

External links
 
 Orthoptera Species File - Distribution and taxonomy for sensu stricto sp.
 Agroatlas.ru - Information and images

Gryllotalpidae
Orthoptera of Europe
Insects described in 1805